The 2004 European Promotion Cup for Men was the 9th edition of this tournament. It was hosted in Andorra, whose national team won its third tournament by defeating Luxembourg in the final.

Preliminary round

Group A

Group B

Classification games

|}

Final

Final ranking

External links
FIBA Archive

2004
2004–05 in European basketball
International basketball competitions hosted by Andorra
2004 in Andorran sport